The pasiking (English term: knapbasket) is the indigenous basket-backpack found among the various ethno-linguistic groups of Northern Luzon in the Philippines. Pasiking designs have sacred allusions, although most are purely aesthetic. These artifacts, whether handwoven traditionally or with contemporary variations, are considered exemplars of functional basketry in the Philippines and among Filipinos.

Both of those types have palm bast weatherproofing.

Some of the Northern Philippine tribal groups called Igorots or Cordillerans that weave pasiking are the Apayaos or Isneg, the Tinguian of Abra province, the Kalingas of Kalinga province, the Gaddang, the Bugkalot, the Applai, the Bontocs of Bontoc, Mountain Province, the Ilagod, the Bago, the Kankana-ey, the Balangao, the Ibaloi, the Ifugaos, the Ikalahan, the Kalanguya, the Karao, and the Ilongots. It is also woven using rattan by non-Cordilleran persons.

Common materials used in construction are rattan and bamboo.  There are pasiking specimens utilizing deer hide (parfleche), wood, turtle shell, and crocodile skin. 

A deconstructed version of the pasiking, including dozens of variants, were exhibited in the BenCab Museum.  There are also 21st century pasiking that are made of recyclable materials like plastic cargo straps, canvas conveyor belts, and recycled detonation cord.

In the 1970s on through the 1980s, the pasiking has also been a symbol among Filipino students for nationalist activism.  There was a decline of making traditional bamboo crafts, including the pasiking, during the 1980s but in the mid-2010s, the industry of bamboo crafts came into resurgence with the help of the Philippines' Department of Trade and Industry.

References

Philippine handicrafts
Philippine clothing
Philippine fashion
Bags
Camping equipment
Domestic implements
Hiking equipment
Luggage